The 2014–15 Portland State Vikings women's basketball team represented Portland State University during the 2014–15 NCAA Division I women's basketball season. The Vikings, led by eighth year head coach Sherri Murrell, played their home games at the Peter Stott Center and were members of the Big Sky Conference. After a 3–21 start to the season, head coach Sherri Murrell was fired. Assistant coach Jennifer Mountain was named the Vikings interim head coach for the remainder of the season. They finished the season 4–25, 2–16 in Big Sky play to finish in last place. They failed to qualify for the Big Sky women's tournament.

Roster

Schedule

|-
!colspan=9 style="background:#02461D; color:#FFFFFF;"| Exhibition

|-
!colspan=9 style="background:#02461D; color:#FFFFFF;"| Regular season

See also
2014–15 Portland State Vikings men's basketball team

References

Portland State
Portland State Vikings women's basketball
Portland State Vikings women's basketball